The 2021 Africa U-20 Cup of Nations qualification was a men's under-20 football competition which decided the participating teams for the 2021 Africa U-20 Cup of Nations.

Players born 1 January 2001 or later were eligible to participate in the competition. A total of twelve teams qualified to play in the final tournament, including Mauritania who qualified automatically as hosts.

Teams
47 of the 54 CAF members entered the qualifying tournament of their zone, including the hosts Mauritania, which also participated in qualification despite automatically qualified for the final tournament.

This was the first edition in Africa U-20 Cup of Nations to have expanded to 12 teams instead of eight. Each of the six zones received two spots in the final tournament.

Notes
Teams in bold qualified for the final tournament.
(H): Qualifying tournament hosts
(Q): Automatically qualified for final tournament regardless of qualification results

Schedule
The qualifying competition was split into regional competitions, with the teams entering the qualifying tournament of their zone.  The final arrangements of the zonal qualifiers were decided later due to the delays caused by the COVID-19 pandemic. The schedule of each qualifying zone was as follows.

North Zone

Tunisia hosted the 2020 UNAF U-20 Tournament, which also served as the qualifiers for the Africa U-20 Cup of Nations, between 15 to 27 December 2020. The matches were played at Radès (Stade Olympique de Radès) and Tunis (Stade El Menzah).

The draw for the fixtures was held on 30 November 2020. The five teams were placed in one group, with the winners and the runners-up qualifying for the final tournament.

All times are local, CET (UTC+1).

<onlyinclude>

West A Zone
Senegal hosted the WAFU-UFOA Zone A U-20 Championship between 20–29 November 2020. The matches were played at Thiès (Stade Lat-Dior) and Pikine (Stade Al Djigo).

All times are local, GMT (UTC±0).

Group stage
The draw for the group stage was held on 6 November 2020. The seven teams were drawn into two groups of three and four teams. The winners and the runners-up of each group advanced to the semi-finals.

Group A

Group B

Knockout stage

Semi-finals

Final
Winner qualified for 2021 Africa U-20 Cup of Nations.

West B Zone
The WAFU-UFOA Zone B qualifiers for the Africa U-20 Cup of Nations were initially planned to be hosted by Burkina Faso, but were later shifted to Togo due to the Covid-19 pandemic, with the matches scheduled to be played between 18 November–2 December. On 7 November, Togo announced that they would not be able to host the tournament due to a resurgence of COVID-19 cases in the country, with the outbreak located in the Lomé area.

On 17 November, it was announced that the regional qualifiers would now be played in Benin between 5 and 19 December. The draw was also announced on the same day. The matches were played at Porto-Novo (Stade Charles de Gaulle) and Cotonou (Stade René Pleven).

All times are local, WAT (UTC+1).

Group stage
The seven teams were drawn into two groups of three and four teams. The winners and the runners-up of each group advanced to the semi-finals.

Group A

Group B

Knockout stage

Semi-finals
Winners qualified for 2021 Africa U-20 Cup of Nations.

Third place match

Final

Central Zone
The UNIFFAC qualifiers for the Africa U-20 Cup of Nations were held in Equatorial Guinea between 15–22 December 2020. The matches were played at Malabo (Estadio de Malabo).

All times are local, WAT (UTC+1).

Group stage
The six teams were drawn into two groups of three teams. The winners of each group qualified for the 2021 Africa U-20 Cup of Nations.

Group A

Group B

Final

Central-East Zone

The CECAFA qualifiers for the Africa U-20 Cup of Nations were initially planned to be hosted by Sudan in October–November 2020 but were then later shifted and held in Tanzania between 22 November–2 December 2020. The matches were played at Karatu (Black Rhino Academy) and Arusha (Sheikh Amri Abeid Memorial Stadium).

All times are local, EAT (UTC+3).

Group stage

All the 11 teams were drawn into 3 groups, 2 groups of 4 teams and 1 group of 3 teams. The winners of each group and the best runners-up advanced to the semi-finals.

Group A

Group B

Group C

Ranking of second-placed teams

Knockout stage

Semi-finals
Winners qualified for 2021 Africa U-20 Cup of Nations.

Third place match

Final

South Zone

The COSAFA qualifiers for the Africa U-20 Cup of Nations were initially planned to be hosted by Mauritius, but were later shifted to South Africa after Mauritius withdrew as hosts due to the COVID-19 regulations. The matches were played at Port Elizabeth (Wolfson Stadium, Gelvandale Stadium and Nelson Mandela Bay Stadium).

All times are local, SAST (UTC+2).

Group stage
The group stage was played in 3 groups as a round-robin, where the group winners and the best runner up advanced to the semi-finals.

Group A

Group B

Group C

Ranking of second-placed teams
Due to groups having a different number of teams, the results against the fourth-placed teams in four-team groups were not considered for this ranking.

Knockout stage

Semi-finals
Winners qualified for 2021 Africa U-20 Cup of Nations.

Third place match

Final

Qualified teams
The following 12 teams qualify for the final tournament.

1 Bold indicates champions for that year. Italic indicates hosts for that year.

Goalscorers

Notes

References

U-20 Championship qualification
Africa U-20 Cup of Nations qualification
Qualification
2021
November 2020 sports events in Africa
December 2020 sports events in Africa
Association football events postponed due to the COVID-19 pandemic